Urca is a traditional and wealthy residential neighborhood with nearly 7,000 inhabitants (2000 census) in Rio de Janeiro, Brazil. Although most of the neighborhood dates from the 1920s, parts of it are much older. What is now called the Forte São João, a military base at the foot of the Sugarloaf Mountain, is where the first Portuguese settlement in Rio was founded by Estácio de Sá on March 1, 1565. The French had arrived 12 years earlier and founded a settlement, called France Antarctique, close to what is now Flamengo and Gloria districts, in downtown Rio. The French, riven by internal disputes between Catholics and Protestants, were massacred by the Portuguese and their Indian allies in attacks organised from here, expelling them from the nearby Villegagnon Island (named after the French commander Nicolas Durand de Villegaignon). The street now called Rua São Sebastião, in Urca, which leads from behind the fort to the Urca casino, was originally a trail from the Portuguese fort skirting the edge of the sea to the mainland along the peninsula that houses the Sugar Loaf and a smaller hill, the Morro da Urca. Rua São Sebastião thus has some claim to be the oldest street in Rio.

History

Building space in Rio is restricted by the city's geography, which offers formidable physical barriers to urban expansion. The notion of filling in part of the shallow bay around the Morro Vermelho and building a neighborhood on it was mooted periodically in the nineteenth century, and in the 1880s a development company was formed for the purpose, Urbanização Carioca, whose acronym Urca gave the neighbourhood its name. But, some historians contest this version, identifying the name Urca already stamped in 18th century maps. "Urca", in old Portuguese tradition, designates a small and large cargo ship. Legal wrangles over financing and land titles delayed work for a generation, but the landfill began shortly after the conclusion of World War I and the first houses were built in 1922. The centrepiece of the new neighbourhood was a cassino, originally conceived as a competitor to the newly installed cassino in the luxury Copacabana Palace hotel, in those days a rather longer and more inconvenient haul from downtown Rio.

The neighbourhood's origin as a 1920s urban development is very evident. Photos of the area on the 1930s show lots divided up, a low sea wall, individual houses and the trees so characteristic of the area now mere saplings. It is perhaps second only to Santa Tereza as a carioca urban neighbourhood in its pleasantness, architectural unity and lack of the crass development which has scarred so much of the city. Part of this is explained by the neighborhood's insularity. The developers of Urca made their money by dividing up the neighbourhood into lots and selling them to small investors, many of them recent European immigrants, especially Portuguese, of relatively modest means – the richer middle class headed for the more glamorous neighbourhoods of Copacabana and Leme, the other side of Praia Vermelha. The heavy military presence around Urca in the coup-prone 1920s was also a disincentive for those with money to afford a beach house elsewhere. Many of the present inhabitants of Urca are the descendants of families who bought houses or plots when the area was originally developed.

It is easy to see the successive phases of Urca's development strolling around the neighbourhood. Most of the residential houses date from the late 1920s to the late 1940s and are a portfolio of house styles popular at the time: art deco houses and apartment buildings, the faux Spanish colonial style, so popular throughout the Americas in the 1930s and 1940s, but locally called Manuelino style (after the 16th-century Portuguese king Manuel I) and mock Tudor houses cheerfully aping the English interwar suburbs, often painted with a very un-English flair and color. The seafront Avenida Luis Alves has a number of modest apartment buildings, most from the 1950s and 1960s, but to a far lesser extent than any other neighbourhood in the Zona Sul. The commercial Rua Marechal Cantuária which leads traffic into the heart of Urca is the only street to have suffered significant redevelopment, but even then at a low level and very little since the 1960s. It is much used by filmmakers and 'novela' producers looking for period settings.

The casino flourished and was a fixture of Rio's social scene in the prewar and immediate postwar period. Urca's most famous resident, Carmen Miranda, was discovered by a Hollywood producer visiting the casino in 1938, where she was a singer. She rented a small house on Rua São Sebastião, on the left walking up from the casino, where a plaque on the wall, the only one in Rio commemorating a famous person's house, remembers the "pequena notável", the "little wonder". The casino also played a minor role in the history of astrophysics. Two scientists in the casino, discussing a model explaining neutrino emission patterns in the cooling of stars, called it after the casino when they noticed how rapidly money, like energy pulsing from a dying star, disappeared from the roulette table. But astrophysics notwithstanding, the money ran out in the end. In 1946 a federal ban on casinos put the Cassino da Urca out of business. The building was later acquired by TV Tupí, a pioneering Brazilian television station owned by Assis Chateaubriand, the first Brazilian media mogul.

TV Tupi built a new frontage for the building onto the beach, increasing its internal space and turning the curved 1930s exterior into a plain right-angled building. The TV Tupi studio became best known as the location of the Chacrinha program, a variety program which ran on weekend afternoons from the 1960s to the 1980s, with an enormous national audience. A slot on Chacrinha for any musician, dancer, actor or starlet was a sign they had finally arrived. The ageing inhabitants of Urca were, however, never entirely at ease with the crowds of screaming teenagers who regularly invaded their tranquil streets chasing their idols. Many greeted the closure of the studios in the late 1980s with relief, but the abandonment of the cassino and its being left to rot until 2008 was unfortunately typical of the misgovernment and neglect which has blighted modern Rio. It is currently being renovated to serve as a design institute.

Urca's long association with entertainment is reflected in the number of Brazilian musicians and artists who live there. The most famous is Roberto Carlos, who lives in a relatively modest penthouse apartment on the seafront and, devout Catholic as he is, can sometimes be caught singing in Urca's only church.

Although Forte São João is a military base, visitors are allowed in on weekday afternoons if they say they want to visit the fort's museum, the 'Museu do Forte". The walls we can see today are a typical early seventeenth-century Portuguese fort, like many others around the country, with several original cannons. But the main attraction is the extraordinary location. The Sugar Loaf plunges down to the beach behind the fort, the Praia de Fora. A number of fine Art Deco buildings are next to the fort, notably a gymnasium built in 1932. The inevitable football field next to the gymnasium, with the Sugar Loaf behind one goal, the fort behind the other and the beach looking out across the entrance to Guanabara bay parallel to one sideline, is arguably the most spectacularly located football pitch in the world. It was used as a training ground by the England squad in the 2014 World Cup, who predictably failed to draw any inspiration from it on their way to an ignominiously early elimination.

See also
 Pista Cláudio Coutinho – local walking trail
 Escola de Comando e Estado-Maior do Exército (Brazil) - Brazilian Army Command and Staff College
 Military Institute of Engineering

References 

Neighbourhoods in Rio de Janeiro (city)
Guanabara Bay